Alfie Joshua Bendle (born 27 January 2005) is an English professional footballer who plays as a central midfielder for AFC Wimbledon.

Career
Bendle, who had previously played youth football with Brighton and Hove Albion and spent time on loan with Corinthian Casuals, signed a professional contract for Wimbledon on his seventeenth birthday.

Bendle made his professional debut in the final game of the 2021–22 EFL League One season at home at Plough Lane on 30 April 2022 against Accrington Stanley in a 4-3 defeat that confirmed Wimbledon’s relegation to EFL League Two.

The next season, Bendle came on in the 88th minute for Ethan Chislett against Gillingham on 30 July 2022.

On the 20th January 2023, it was announced that Bendle would join National League South club Eastbourne Borough on loan until the end of the season. Bendle was recalled early from his loan, after making 11 appearances for Borough, due to an injury crisis at Wimbledon.

Career statistics

References

2005 births
Living people
AFC Wimbledon players
Corinthian-Casuals F.C. players
Eastbourne Borough F.C. players
English Football League players
Isthmian League players
English footballers
Association football midfielders